Shot Marilyns is a series of silkscreen paintings produced in 1964 by Andy Warhol, each canvas measuring 40 inches square, and each a portrait of Marilyn Monroe.

History 
Pop artist Andy Warhol had a fascination with Hollywood and fame. A legend of the silver screen, Marilyn Monroe is widely considered to be the epitome of Hollywood glamour. After her death at the age of 36 in August 1962, Warhol began immortalizing her in his work. "In August '62 I started doing silkscreens.... It was all so simple-quick and chancy. I was thrilled with it. My first experiments with screens were heads of Troy Donahue and Warren Beatty, and then when Marilyn Monroe happened to die that month, I got the idea to make screens of her beautiful face — the first Marilyns."

In 1964, Warhol created portraits of Monroe based on a publicity photo for her 1953 film Niagara. He painted five Marilyn silkscreen portraits with different colored backgrounds: red, orange, light blue, sage blue, and turquoise, and stored them at The Factory, his studio on East 47th Street in Manhattan.

Shooting
Dorothy Podber, a performance artist and friend of Factory photographer Billy Name, saw the recently completed paintings stacked against one another at the studio and asked Warhol if she could shoot them. Believing that she intended to photograph the paintings, Warhol agreed. Podber doffed her pair of black gloves, withdrew a small revolver from her purse, and fired a shot into the stack of four paintings, which became known as The Shot Marilyns. The fifth painting with the turquoise background was not in the stack.

In the 2002 documentary How to Draw a Bunny, Name described this event as a "performance piece" by Podber. After she had shot the paintings and left, Andy Warhol purportedly asked Name to please ask Podber not to do that again. She was, however, henceforth barred from The Factory for life.

Acquisitions 
Blue Shot Marilyn was purchased by Peter Brant for $5,000 in 1967.

Shot Red Marilyn was sold to Masao Wanibuchi for $4.1 million at Christie's in 1989. In the midst of an art market recession, he sold it at a loss to Philip Niarchos for $3.6 million in 1994.

Orange Marilyn was bought for $17.3 million by Si Newhouse in 1998. After his death, Kenneth C. Griffin purchased it for around $200 million in 2017.

Turquoise Marilyn was bought by Steve Cohen in 2007 for a rumored $80 million.

Shot Sage Blue Marilyn was auctioned by Christie's in New York City on May 9, 2022. It sold for $195 million from the Foundation of Thomas and Doris Ammann. This sale greatly extended the record for a price paid at auction for a work by an American artist set by Jean-Michel Basquiat's 1982 painting Untitled, which sold for $110.5 million in 2017. It also set the mark for the most expensive work of 20th century art sold in a public sale.
The  purchaser was the American art dealer Larry Gagosian.  It has not been disclosed as of yet whether he was buying the work for himself or a secondary party.

See also
 Gold Marilyn Monroe, 1962
 Marilyn Diptych, 1962
 List of most expensive paintings

References

 Livingstone, Marco (ed.), Pop Art: An International Perspective, The Royal Academy of Arts, London, 1991, 
 Stokstad, Marilyn, Art History, 1995, Prentice Hall, Inc., and Harry N. Abrams, Inc., Publishers, 
 Vogel, Carol (1998). The New York Times:  INSIDE ART; Perhaps Shot, Perhaps Not . Retrieved January 4, 2008.
 Warhol, Andy and Pat Hackett, Popism: The Warhol Sixties, Harcourt Books, 1980, 
 Watson, Steven, Factory Made: Warhol and the Sixties, Pantheon Books, 2003.

External links
 Dorothy Podber obit
 The Independent: Dorothy Podber: 'Witch' who shot Warhol's Marilyns

1964 paintings
Paintings by Andy Warhol
Painting series
Cultural depictions of Marilyn Monroe
Performance art